Ester Fenoll Garcia (b. La Seu d'Urgell, Spain, 6 June 1967) is a poet and writer, and a civil servant living in the Principality of Andorra.

Biography 
Ester Fenoll has a degree in Law, a postgraduate degree in Adult Guardianship from the University of Barcelona and a postgraduate degree in Andorran Law from the University of Andorra. 

She began management of the Fundació Privada Tutelar in 2007, even as she was also the president and co-founder of the Association of Autism Affected People of the Principality of Andorra (Autea). She was also a member of the Federation of Andorran Disability Associations (FAAD). As a columnist, her work has appeared in the periodicals Foc i lloc of the Diari d'Andorra.

Fenoll joined the Andorran government in 2011 with her appointment as a permanent member of the Health and Welfare Advisory Council. In April 2015, she moved on to become Secretary of State for Social Affairs of the Government of Andorra.

In May 2019, as the principality's Secretary of State for Social Affairs and Employment, Fenoll spoke at the Forum on Knowledge, Innovation and Sustainability, held in Madrid, Spain, organized by the Ibero-American Secretariat as well as the Andorran Embassy there. She spoke about Andorra's gender equality policies and details about a new law in Andorra on the rights of children and adolescents. Fenoll went on to discuss "Andorra's commitment to the inclusion of vulnerable people, especially people with disabilities, and defended the experience of the Network of Inclusive Companies."

On 10 July 2019, Fenoll was appointed the Secretary General of the Government and is sometimes referred to as Ester Fenoll Garcia in official correspondence.

Selected publications 
Fenoll's works can be found in Catalan and Spanish.

 "Esmorzar perfecte" (Perfect breakfast). (in Catalan) Andorra: Fundació Caixabank, 2006. 
"Anticipant octubre" (Anticipating October). (in Catalan) Tarragona: Arola, 2008. 
Agradezco tu amor pero tengo otros planes (I appreciate your love but I have other plans). (in Spanish)  Andorra: Aloma, 2011. 
Fenoll also collaborated with other authors to produce the book, Autism, let's break the silence with poetry. Vienna Editions. March 2014

Awards 

 First prize in the 6th edition of the Miquel Martí i Pol Poetry Competition awarded by the Government of Andorra
 Finalist of the 6th Short Poetry Competition of the Polytechnic University of Catalonia, 2004
 28th edition of the Grandalla Poetry Prize 2005, with Perfect Breakfast

References 

1967 births
Living people
Catalan-language writers
Writers from Catalonia
Journalists from Catalonia
People from Andorra la Vella
20th-century women writers
20th-century short story writers